Mirko Reichel (born 2 December 1970) is a German former professional footballer who played as a midfielder.

Career statistics

References

External links
 

1970 births
Living people
German footballers
East German footballers
Association football midfielders
Bundesliga players
2. Bundesliga players
FC Erzgebirge Aue players
SV Waldhof Mannheim players
VfL Bochum players
SpVgg Greuther Fürth players